Krzysztof Kubów is a Polish politician. Kubów is a Law and Justice Member of the Sejm for Legnica.

References

Living people
Law and Justice politicians
Members of the Polish Sejm 2015–2019
Members of the Polish Sejm 2019–2023
1984 births